Ivan Radivojević (born 8 November 1968) is a retired Serbian football midfielder.

References

1968 births
Living people
Serbian footballers
FK Napredak Kruševac players
FK Partizan players
NK Olimpija Ljubljana (1945–2005) players
FC Lokomotiv 1929 Sofia players
PFC Slavia Sofia players
Association football midfielders
Serbian expatriate footballers
Expatriate footballers in Bulgaria
Serbian expatriate sportspeople in Bulgaria
First Professional Football League (Bulgaria) players